Khadga Prasad Sharma Oli (born 22 February 1952) is a Nepalese politician, former Prime Minister of Nepal and the current leader of the Opposition. He has served three terms as prime minister, from 11 October 2015 to 3 August 2016, from 15 February 2018 to 13 May 2021 as the first prime minister to be appointed following the first general election under the new constitution, and from 13 May 2021 to 13 July 2021.

Oli is noted for taking a more hardline stance with regard to the Indian government during and in the aftermath of the 2015 Nepal blockade. He strengthened relations with China as an alternative to Nepal's traditional close trade ties with India and updated the map of Nepal by constitutional amendment including territories disputed with India, for which he has received some domestic praise and a reputation as a nationalist. While in office, Oli was marred by controversy for frequent use of tongue-in-cheek remarks, hostility towards critics and the media, silence on corruption by colleagues and business aides, failing to deliver on economic growth, and for deviating from promised budgetary expenditures despite a historic majority in the 2017 legislative election.

Early life 
Oli was born on 22 February 1952 in Aathrai, Tehrathum as the eldest child of Mohan Prasad and Madhumaya Oli in a Brahmin family of farmers. He belongs to a Kumaoni Brahmin family. Oli was raised by his grandmother, Rammaya, after his mother died of smallpox when he was four. He completed his primary school education in Tehrathum and moved to Jhapa in 1962. Oli adheres to Hinduism.

Early political career 

Oli began his political career in 1966 in opposition to the partyless Panchayat system in place at the time. He joined the Communist Party of Nepal in February 1970. He was involved in subversive politics and was arrested for the first time in 1970. A year later he became a district committee member of the party and soon the chief of the Jhapa Movement Organizing Committee in 1972. Oli was imprisoned for 14 consecutive years from 1973 to 1987 for being against autocratic Panchayat system. After his release from prison in 1987, he became a central committee member of Communist Party of Nepal (Unified Marxist–Leninist) and in-charge of the Lumbini zone until 1990.

Multi-party democracy (1991–2006) 
After the 1990 People's Movement, he was elected to the House of Representatives from Jhapa–6 in 1991. He was appointed chief of the foreign relations department of the CPN (UML) in 1992.

He was re-elected to the parliament in 1994 and served as the Minister for Home Affairs in Manmohan Adhikari's minority government. He was re-elected from in 1999 from Jhapa constituencies 2 and 6 upon which he gave up his Jhapa–6 seat.

Transition period 
Oli was appointed Deputy Prime Minister and Minister for Foreign Affairs as part of the interim government of Girija Prasad Koirala in 2006. He was also assigned to look into the death of fellow politician Madan Bhandari and the investigation committee later declared it to be an unsolved murder.

He was defeated in the 2008 Constituent Assembly election from Jhapa–7. He also lost the election for the position of chairman to Jhala Nath Khanal during the eight general convention of CPN (UML) in 2009.

He was elected from Jhapa–7 in the 2013 Constituent Assembly election and became leader of the CPN (UML) parliamentary party on 4 February 2014, defeating party chairman Khanal by a vote of 98 to 75 in the parliamentary party. Oli was subsequently elected as the chairman of CPN (UML) in July 2014 during the party's ninth general convention.

First premiership 
Oli was elected Prime Minister in a parliamentary vote on 11 October 2015, receiving 338 votes out of 597 members in the Legislature Parliament. Oli's candidacy was supported by the Unified Communist Party of Nepal (Maoist), Rastriya Prajatantra Party Nepal, and Madhesi Jana Adhikar Forum along with 13 other small parties. He was sworn in on 12 October.

His first stint was dominated by the economic blockade imposed by India upon the promulgation of the constitution of Nepal. He took a defiant stance against India's position to amend the constitution and signed trade and transit treaties with China to counter Indian dependence.

Following the withdrawal of support from CPN (Maoist Centre) on 13 July 2016 from the existing coalition government and subsequent registration of a no-confidence motion by the party on 14 July 2016, the CPN (UML)–led government and prime minister Oli seemingly shrank into a minority, pressuring him to resign. However, CPN (UML) decided to discuss the filed no-confidence motion in the house which led to a three-day parliamentary meeting of the concerned parties. During the process, two other major parties, the Rastriya Prajatantra Party and Madhesi Jana Adhikar Forum, also withdrew their support from the coalition. On the third day, 24 July 2016, after addressing the opposition parties in parliament, Oli announced his resignation. The Indian government was accused of conspiring in bringing down Oli as he stood firmly against the economic blockade imposed by India; an allegation categorically rejected by the Ministry of External Affairs of India.

Second premiership 
Oli was appointed Prime Minister for a second time on 15 February 2018 after CPN (UML) became the largest party in the House of Representatives following the 2017 legislative elections with support from Communist Party of Nepal (Maoist Centre), the same party whose withdrawal of support had led to resignation in his first term. He passed a motion of confidence with on 11 March 2018 with 208 out of 268 votes in the 275-member House of Representatives. The left alliance of the CPN (UML) and CPN (Maoist Centre) merged to form the Nepal Communist Party (NCP) on 17 May 2018, turning Oli's coalition government to a majority, and giving him a two-third majority in the House.

In May 2020, the Oli government unveiled new maps of the country including the disputed territories of Kalapani, Lipulekh and Limpiyadhura in response to the inauguration of a road across the Lipulekh pass by the Indian government, which led to a "cartographic war" between the two countries. The government swiftly brought a constitutional amendment bill to amend the official map and emblem of the country in the parliament, which was passed unanimously in both houses before being authenticated by President Bidya Devi Bhandari.

In December 2020, the Oli government recommended the dissolution of the House of Representatives and called for fresh elections on 30 April and 10 May 2021; a step that was readily endorsed by the president. Oli took this step after a series of infighting in the ruling NCP, which culminated with a faction of the party, led by former prime ministers Pushpa Kamal Dahal and Madhav Kumar Nepal, planning to register a motion of no-confidence against Oli in the House. Oli's reluctance in withdrawing a controversial Constitutional Council Act further led to tensions in the ruling party. This decision from Oli was overturned by the Supreme Court on 23 February 2021, when a constitutional bench led by Chief Justice Cholendra Shumsher Rana deemed the dissolution of the House to be unconstitutional, and called for the House to be reinstated and a meeting of the Parliament to be held within 13 days. Oli accepted the verdict of the Supreme Court and called for a meeting of the parliament on 7 March.

On 7 March 2021, the Supreme Court delivered a landmark ruling awarding the Nepal Communist Party to Rishiram Kattel after he had challenged the Election Commission's ruling of providing the name of his party to the NCP formed after the merger of CPN (UML) and CPN (Maoist Centre). The court's verdict invalidated the ruling party jointly led by Oli and Dahal, effectively reviving the former CPN (UML) and CPN (Maoist Centre) parties. This reduced Oli's government back to a coalition further mounting political tensions in the country. The CPN (Maoist Centre) recalled its ministers on 13 March 2021 and withdrew its support from the Oli government on 5 May 2021, effectively turning it into a minority government.

On 10 May 2021, Oli failed to obtain a vote of confidence gaining only 93 of the total 232 votes cast in the House of Representatives, which fell 43 votes short of reaching the 136-vote majority required to win the confidence vote. His status was subsequently converted to that of a caretaker prime minister until the appointment of another prime minister by the president.

Third premiership
Oli was appointed Prime Minister for a third time on 13 May 2021 by President Bidya Devi Bhandari, albeit as a minority prime minister, as none of the opposition parties were able to form a majority government or lay their claim for it in the provided time frame. Following the dissolution of the House of Representatives by the president at midnight on 22 May 2021, the Oli government turned into an interim government until fresh elections were held from 12 to 19 November 2021.

On 12 July 2021, the constitutional bench of the Supreme Court formed to hear writs against the dissolution of the House of Representatives filed by the opposition alliance; the Supreme Court stated that president Bidya Devi Bhandari's decision to dissolve the House of Representatives on the recommendation of prime minister Oli was unlawful and ordered the appointment of Nepali Congress president Sher Bahadur Deuba as prime minister within 28 hours.

Recently, Oli has been appointed as chairman of  CPN (UML) from his party convention that happened in Chitwan.

Electoral history 
He has been elected to the Pratinidhi Sabha from Jhapa in 1991, 1994, 1999 and 2017 on a CPN (UML) ticket. He contested and won from two constituencies in the 1999 election and gave up his Jhapa–6 seat. He lost the 2008 Constituent assembly election, but was elected in 2013. Since the promulgation of the new constitution, he has contested two elections from Jhapa -5 seat, one in 2017 and other in 2022, and won both by scoring majority of votes.  Only the top two candidates are shown below.

1991 Nepalese general election

1994 Nepalese general election

1999 Nepalese general election

2008 Constituent Assembly election

2013 Constituent Assembly election

2015 Parliamentary Prime Minister election

2017 Nepalese general election

2022 Nepalese general election

Personal life 
Oli is married to Radhika Shakya. He met his wife, a fellow communist, after he was released from prison. They first met during party activities and married later.

Health issues
Oli has twice undergone kidney transplant. The first transplant was done in 2007 in Apollo Hospital, New Delhi. The second transplant was carried out in 2020 in Tribhuvan University Teaching Hospital, Kathmandu. For the second transplant, he received kidney from 32-year-old Samikshya Sangraula, who is reportedly Oli's niece by relation. A senior transplant surgeon from New Delhi, who had done his transplant in 2007, was also present to assist the procedure in Kathmandu.

Controversial claims
Oli is known for his tongue-in-cheek remarks and use of various slang and proverbs, often with double meanings and criticism; some directed to his own party. Oli claims he learnt this technique during the Panchayat era when he was underground to entertain his colleagues. Some of his controversial claims are:
Super computer, February 2019: Oli claimed that the world is amazed by the supercomputer being built by Nepal. He was referring to a computer that was being built in the Banepa IT Park, which the makers have claimed to be a supercomputer in spite of its lacking computing power.
Rhino and Mount Everest, August 2019: Oli claimed rhinoceros should be called using the Nepali word for the animal, Gainda instead of rhinoceros and Mount Everest should be known as Sagarmatha by everyone. He said, "...Do you know what gaida [is]? You people know gaida as rhino. But rhinos are not rhinos, they are gaida. I request you to remember this word—gaida...".
Indian coronavirus, May 2020: During the COVID-19 pandemic in Nepal, Oli had lashed out at India, saying that the “Indian virus” was more dangerous than the “Chinese or Italian virus” and even made light of the Indian national emblem. He said this during an address to the parliament where he blamed the rising number of coronavirus cases on individuals breaking the nationwide lockdown, especially those sneaking into Nepal from India, claiming that "people coming from India through illegal channels are spreading the virus in the country." This sparked a round of media attention in India.
Sneeze out the virus, June 2020: While addressing the National Assembly, Oli claimed, “...Corona is like the flu, if contracted, one should sneeze, drink hot water and drive the virus away...” generating ridicule in the national media and social networks. He also claimed ginger, garlic and turmeric are known to have vitamins and antioxidants that can help boost the immune system to fight coronavirus.
Lord Rama is a Nepali, July 2020: While addressing a function celebrating the 207th birth anniversary of poet Bhanubhakta Acharya, Oli said Lord Rama was born in Nepal and India had created a fake Ayodhya. He claimed Thori, a place near Birgunj in southern Nepal, to be the birthplace of Rama and it was impossible for Rama to reach Janakpur in eastern Nepal to marry Sita from Ayodhya in India. He later ordered to investigate this matter, asking officials in the region to study about the whereabouts of Ayodhyapuri. He also claimed to have found strong evidences of the real Ayodhya, including ruins supposedly of Someshwar Gadhi and Valmiki Ashram, both of whom are associated with Lord Rama.
Yoga originated in Nepal, June 2021: On the occasion of International Day of Yoga on 21 June 2021, Oli claimed that Yoga originated in Uttarakhand and Nepal in particular. According to him, India as a country did not exist at the time when Yogic science was founded. This caused series of backlash from Nepali and Indian social media.

Bibliography

See also
First Oli cabinet
Second Oli cabinet
Imran Khan

References

External links
Official website of CPN UML

|-

|-

|-

|-

|-

|-

|-

|-

|-

1952 births
Communist Party of Nepal (Marxist–Leninist) (1998) politicians
Communist Party of Nepal (Pushpa Lal) politicians
Communist Party of Nepal (Unified Marxist–Leninist) politicians
Nepal Communist Party (NCP) politicians
Government ministers of Nepal
Prime ministers of Nepal
People from Tehrathum District
Living people
Nepal MPs 2017–2022
Nepalese Hindus
Foreign Ministers of Nepal
Nepal MPs 1991–1994
Nepal MPs 1994–1999
Nepal MPs 1999–2002
Nepalese prisoners and detainees
21st-century prime ministers of Nepal
Bahun
Khas people
Members of the 2nd Nepalese Constituent Assembly
Nepal MPs 2022–present